Nabil Fiqri Mohammad Noor (born 14 April 1987) is a Malaysian field hocker player who plays as a midfielder or forward. He first joined the national team in 2006 and was fielded as a forward before changing position in midfield.

Biography
Nabil was born in Negeri Sembilan, and graduated in University Putra Malaysia.

In 2016, Nabil have been undergoing inspector training at the Police Training Centre in Kuala Lumpur.

References

External links
 

1987 births
Living people
Malaysian Muslims
Malaysian people of Malay descent
People from Negeri Sembilan
Malaysian male field hockey players
Asian Games medalists in field hockey
Field hockey players at the 2010 Asian Games
Field hockey players at the 2014 Asian Games
2014 Men's Hockey World Cup players
Field hockey players at the 2018 Asian Games
2018 Men's Hockey World Cup players
Asian Games silver medalists for Malaysia
Medalists at the 2010 Asian Games
Medalists at the 2018 Asian Games
Southeast Asian Games gold medalists for Malaysia
Southeast Asian Games medalists in field hockey
Competitors at the 2017 Southeast Asian Games
21st-century Malaysian people